The 1997 Uncensored was the third Uncensored professional wrestling pay-per-view (PPV) event produced by World Championship Wrestling (WCW). The event took place on March 16, 1997 from the North Charleston Coliseum in Charleston, South Carolina.

The main event was a triangle elimination match between Team nWo (Hollywood Hogan, Randy Savage, Kevin Nash and Scott Hall) (with Dennis Rodman), Team Piper (Roddy Piper, Chris Benoit, Steve McMichael and Jeff Jarrett) and Team WCW (Lex Luger, The Giant and Scott Steiner). Each team had a specific prize upon winning the match. If Team WCW won, all the championships held by the nWo would be stripped and its members would not be allowed to wrestle for three years. If Piper's team had won, he would have gotten a steel cage match against Hogan for the WCW World Heavyweight Championship at a time and place of his choosing. If the nWo won, they would earn the right to challenge for any WCW championship at any time they wanted.

Storylines
The event featured wrestlers from pre-existing scripted feuds and storylines. Wrestlers portrayed villains, heroes, or less distinguishable characters in the scripted events that built tension and culminated in a wrestling match or series of matches. On the February 24, 1997 episode of WCW Monday Nitro, Lex Luger and The Giant agreed to give the tag team titles they won at Superbrawl back to Scott Hall and Kevin Nash in exchange for the NWO putting all their titles on the line, thus setting up the main event at Uncensored 1997.

Team Piper was originally composed of Roddy Piper, John Tenta, Layton Morrison (a kickboxer), and Craig Mally (a boxer). On the March 10, 1997 episode of WCW Monday Nitro, which aired six days before the pay-per-view, they were replaced by The Four Horsemen members Chris Benoit, Steve McMichael and Jeff Jarrett. Team WCW originally included Rick Steiner, but he was attacked prior to the match by the nWo and was unable to compete, leaving the team at a one-man disadvantage in the match.

Event

Dean Malenko defeated Eddie Guerrero to win the WCW United States Heavyweight Championship.

The WCW World Television Championship match between champion Prince Iaukea and Rey Misterio, Jr. originally ended in a 10-minute time limit draw, but the time was extended after a request by Misterio Jr. Minutes later Iaukea pinned Rey Misterio Jr. to retain the championship.

The main event was a triangle elimination match between nWo Team, Piper Team and WCW Team, which nWo won. Had WCW Team won, the nWo would have needed to forfeit all their titles and would be barred from wrestling during any WCW event for 36 months. Had Piper Team won, Piper would have faced Hogan in a steel cage match. Had nWo won, they would have a shot at any WCW championship, any time they wanted. During nWo's celebration after the match, Sting rappelled down to the ring. When Scott Hall and Kevin Nash approached him, Sting attacked them with a baseball bat, then Randy Savage when he tried to intervene. After giving all three of them a Scorpion Death Drop, he gestured for Hollywood Hogan to come at him as well. Hogan did, and was promptly taken out by Sting as well. Sting's actions solidified his allegiance to WCW instead of the nWo, and he would become nWo's main adversary.

Results

Triangle match eliminations

References

External links
Uncensored 1997

WCW Uncensored
1997 in South Carolina
Events in South Carolina
Professional wrestling in South Carolina
March 1997 events in the United States
1997 World Championship Wrestling pay-per-view events